Rushs Ridge is an extinct town in Mississippi County, in the U.S. state of Missouri. The GNIS classifies it as a populated place.

History
A post office called Rush Ridge was established in 1858, and remained in operation until 1861. The community has the name of William Rush, a first settler.  Rush Ridge once had a church  and schoolhouse. A cemetery marks the site.

References

Ghost towns in Missouri
Former populated places in Mississippi County, Missouri